The Links Club is a gentlemen's club in New York City. It is located at 36 East 62nd Street on the Upper East Side of Manhattan in New York City.

History
The club was established in 1916-1917 by Charles B. Macdonald, in a building designed in the Georgian Revival architectural style by Cross & Cross. In the 1960s, it was "a preferred social gathering spot for America's most powerful chief executives." By 2010, it was still a "preserve of the old banking elite", but not all members were WASPs.

References

Gentlemen's clubs in New York City
1917 establishments in New York (state)
Georgian Revival architecture in New York (state)
Upper East Side